Petersfield is located in the Rural Municipality of St. Andrews in Manitoba, Canada. It was the birthplace of First Nation war hero and community activist Tommy Prince.
In Summer, Petersfield plays host to the Petersfield Community Club Mallard Park Market, a popular local destination for locally handmade crafts, baking, vegetables, etc.

References

Unincorporated communities in Interlake Region, Manitoba